Johnny Miler (August 10, 1910 – June 17, 1976), born John Miletich, was a professional boxer who competed in the 1932 Summer Olympics in the light-heavyweight class for the United States.

In late 1932 or early 1933, Miler defeated future heavyweight champion Joe Louis in an amateur bout. Other notable fights included three professional bouts against "Slapsie" Maxie Rosenbloom that ended in two losses and a no decision, and a four round exhibition bout against Max Baer in 1934.

Miler quit professional boxing in 1938. He is the great-uncle of UFC Hall of Fame mixed martial artist Pat Miletich.

Early life
Born John Miletich to Croatian immigrant parents in Hocking, Iowa, a vanished coal mining town just south of Albia, Miler farmed and worked the local coal mines. He supplemented his income by accepting the challenges of traveling carnival strongmen, defeating them in wrestling or boxing matches. He moved to Detroit in 1930.

Boxing

Joe Louis
Miler defeated Louis in three rounds in what was Louis' first organized boxing match, sending Louis to the mat seven times.

1932 Summer Olympics
Despite evidence that Miler had boxed professionally, he won the 1932 Olympic trials in San Francisco and represented the United States in Los Angeles in the light-heavyweight class. Miler lost to William Murphy of Ireland on points in the first match.

Professional boxing
Miler 'officially' debuted professionally as a light-heavyweight on January 12, 1933 against Leon Jasinski in Grand Rapids, Michigan, winning the bout on points. He went on to compile a 12 win (7 by knockout) - 12 loss - 3 draw record over the next 5 1/2 years.

After boxing
Miler eventually joined the Navy then returned to Albia, joining the police force. Miler died on June 17, 1976 in Iowa City, Iowa.

Professional boxing record

|-
|align="center" colspan=8|12 Wins (7 knockouts, 5 decisions), 12 Losses (7 knockouts, 4 decisions, 1 disqualification), 3 Draws
|-
| align="center" style="border-style: none none solid solid; background: #e3e3e3"|Result
| align="center" style="border-style: none none solid solid; background: #e3e3e3"|Record
| align="center" style="border-style: none none solid solid; background: #e3e3e3"|Opponent
| align="center" style="border-style: none none solid solid; background: #e3e3e3"|Type
| align="center" style="border-style: none none solid solid; background: #e3e3e3"|Rd., Time
| align="center" style="border-style: none none solid solid; background: #e3e3e3"|Date
| align="center" style="border-style: none none solid solid; background: #e3e3e3"|Location
| align="center" style="border-style: none none solid solid; background: #e3e3e3"|Notes
|-align=center
|Loss
|12-12-3
|Johnny Paycheck
|TKO
|3 
|October 17, 1938
|align=left| Des Moines, Iowa
|
|-align=center
|Loss
|12-11-3
|Jimmy Adamick
|TKO
|2 
|April 16, 1937
|align=left| Detroit, Michigan
|
|-align=center
|Loss
|12-10-3
|Moose Irwin
|Points
|6
|February 16, 1937
|align=left| Los Angeles, California
|
|-align=center
|style="background:#abcdef;"|Draw
|12-9-3
|Joe Bauer
|Technical Draw
|10
|February 2, 1937
|align=left| Modesto, California
|align=left|
|-align=center
|Loss
|12-9-2
|Bob Nestell
|KO
|2 , 1:51
|November 27, 1936
|align=left| Hollywood, California
|
|-align=center
|Loss
|12-8-2
|Art "Young" Campbell
|Disqualification
|11 
|April 13, 1936
|align=left| Sydney, New South Wales, Australia
| align=left|

|-align=center
|Loss
|12-7-2
|Ambrose Palmer
|TKO
|8 
|March 16, 1936
|align=left| Sydney, New South Wales, Australia
| align=left|
|-align=center
|Win
|12-6-2
|Pret Ferrar
|No Decision 
|10
|November 12, 1935
|align=left| Des Moines, Iowa
|align=left|
|-align=center
|Win
|12-6-2
|Harry Hobbs
|No Decision 
|8
|October 15, 1935
|align=left| Ottumwa, Iowa
|align=left|
|-align=center
|Loss
|12-6-2
|Fred Lenhart
|TKO
|8 
|June 26, 1935
|align=left| Spokane, Washington
|align=left|
|-align=center
|Loss
|12-5-2
|Abe Feldman
|TKO
|5 
|May 10, 1935
|align=left| Hollywood, California
| align=left|
|-align=center
|style="background:#abcdef;"|Draw
|12-4-2
|Wesley Ketchell
|Draw 
|10
|April 12, 1935
|align=left| Hollywood, California
|
|-align=center
|Loss
|12-4-1
|Frank Rowsey
|Loss 
|10
|March 1, 1935
|align=left| Hollywood, California
|
|-align=center
|Loss
|12-3-1
|Maxie Rosenbloom
|Loss 
|10
|February 5, 1935
|align=left| Los Angeles, California
|
|-align=center
|Loss
|12-2-1
|Ray Actis
|TKO
|6 , 1:35
|January 4, 1935
|align=left| San Francisco, California
|
|-align=center
|style="background:#abcdef;"|Draw
|12-1-1
|Maxie Rosenbloom
|No Decision 
|10
|October 22, 1934
|align=left| Des Moines, Iowa
|align=left|
|
|-align=center
|Win
|12-1-1
|Joe Goeders
|No Decision 
|8
|September 3, 1934
|align=left| Graettinger, Iowa
|align=left|
|-align=center
|Win
|12-1-1
|Johnny Neumann
|TKO
|4 
|August 16, 1934
|align=left| Knoxville, Iowa
|
|-align=center
|Win
|11-1-1
|Jack Stocker
|KO
|4 
|July 26, 1934
|align=left| Oskaloosa, Iowa
|
|-align=center
|Win
|10-1-1
|Johnny Saxon
|KO
|3 
|May 29, 1934
|align=left| Des Moines, Iowa
|
|-align=center
|Win
|9-1-1
|Red Fields
|KO
|3 
|May 23, 1934
|align=left| Ottumwa, Iowa
|
|-align=center
|Win
|8-1-1
|Billy Thomas
|KO
|3 
|April 23, 1934
|align=left| New Orleans, Louisiana
|
|-align=center
|Loss 
|7-1-1
|Maxie Rosenbloom
|Decision 
|10
|April 9, 1934
|align=left| New Orleans, Louisiana
|
|-align=center
|Win
|7-0-1
|Al White
|Points
|4
|March 1, 1934
|align=left| Miami, Florida
|
|-align=center
|Win
|6-0-1
|Johnny Whiters
|Points
|10
|December 12 (est.), 1934
|align=left|Unknown
|
|-align=center
|style="background:#abcdef;"|Draw 
|5-0-1
|Joe Lipps
|Draw 
|8
|October 30, 1933
|align=left| Asheville, North Carolina
|
|-align=center
|Win
|5-0-0
|Ed Anderson
|Points
|8
|October 18, 1933
|align=left| Mount Clemens, Michigan
|
|-align=center
|Win
|4-0-0
|Flash Ryser
|KO
|
|March 1 (est.), 1933
|align=left| Detroit, Michigan
|
|-align=center
|Win
|3-0-0
|Willie Davies
|Points
|8
|February 1, 1933
|align=left| Detroit, Michigan
|align=left|
|-align=center
|Win
|2-0-0
|Bobby Mathews
|KO
|1 
|February 1, 1933
|align=left| Detroit, Michigan
|align=left|
|-align=center
|Win
|1-0-0
|Leon Jasinski
|Points
|6
|January 12, 1933
|align=left| Grand Rapids, Michigan
|

References

Further reading
 Bak, Richard (2011), Detroitland: A Collection of Movers, Shakers, Lost Souls, and History Makers from Detroit's Past, Painted Turtle, 

Boxers from Iowa
Heavyweight boxers
1910 births
Boxers at the 1932 Summer Olympics
Olympic boxers of the United States
American male boxers
1976 deaths
American people of Croatian descent